Mattheviidae is an extinct taxonomic family of fossil chitons, marine polyplacophoran mollusks that are found in Cambrian-Silurian deposits.

References

Chitons
Cambrian molluscs
Cambrian first appearances
Cambrian extinctions